The United States Army Capabilities Integration Center (ARCIC), was located on Fort Eustis, VA, as a former U.S. Army center within the army's Training and Doctrine Command (TRADOC) tasked with integrating "warfighting capabilities into the force and among the military services and with other agencies" to include materiel, systems, training, and doctrine. ARCIC has a lead role in the integration of the army's BCT Modernization into the army.

The ARCIC was organized as three Directorates and one command:
The ARCIC Plans & Operations Directorate
The Concept Development and Learning Directorate
The International Army Programs Directorate
The Joint Modernization Command (JMC)

Transfer to Army Futures Command

On June 4, 2018, the  Headquarters, Department of the Army published General Order 2018-10, "Establishment of the United States Army Futures Command," formally transferring ARCIC from TRADOC to the new command effective July 1, 2018. The transition of authority from TRADOC to AFC took place at Fort Eustis, VA on 7 December 2018, with a reflagging of the Center and repatching of the Commander and CSM.

The center, at Futures Command, is now called the Futures and Concepts Center.

References

External links
Army Capabilities Integration Center (ARCIC) Official web page - NOTE: no longer active

United States Army Training and Doctrine Command